Aleksandrów Kujawski railway station is a railway station serving the town of Aleksandrów Kujawski, in the Kuyavian-Pomeranian Voivodeship, Poland. The station is located on the Kutno–Piła railway and Aleksandrów Kujawski–Ciechocinek railway. The train services are operated by PKP and Przewozy Regionalne.

Train services
The station is served by the following services:

Intercity services Gdynia - Gdansk - Bydgoszcz - Torun - Kutno - Lowicz - Warsaw - Lublin - Rzeszow - Zagorz/Przemysl
Intercity services Gdynia - Gdansk - Bydgoszcz - Torun - Kutno - Lodz - Czestochowa - Katowice - Bielsko-Biala
Intercity services Gdynia - Gdansk - Bydgoszcz - Torun - Kutno - Lodz - Czestochowa - Krakow - Zakopane
Intercity services Kolobrzeg - Pila - Bydgoszcz - Torun - Kutno - Lowicz - Warsaw
Intercity services Szczecin - Pila - Bydgoszcz - Torun - Kutno - Lowicz - Warsaw - Lublin - Rzeszow - Przemysl
Intercity services Gorzow Wielkopolskie - Krzyz - Pila - Bydgoszcz - Torun - Kutno - Lowicz - Warsaw
Regional services (R) Bydgoszcz - Solec Kujawski - Torun - Wloclawek - Kutno

References

 This article is based upon a translation of the Polish language version as of November 2016.

External links

Railway stations in Poland opened in 1862
Railway stations in Kuyavian-Pomeranian Voivodeship
Aleksandrów County
Railway stations served by Przewozy Regionalne InterRegio